Sphaerionillum is a genus of beetles in the family Cerambycidae, containing the following species:

 Sphaerionillum castaneum Chemsak & Linsley, 1967
 Sphaerionillum pictum Bates, 1885
 Sphaerionillum quadrisignatum Bates, 1885

References

Elaphidiini